Heteroatomic multiple bonding between group 13 and group 15 elements are of great interest in synthetic chemistry due to their isoelectronicity with C-C multiple bonds. Nevertheless, the difference of electronegativity between group 13 and 15 leads to different character of bondings comparing to C-C multiple bonds. Because of the ineffective overlap between p𝝅 orbitals and the inherent lewis acidity/basicity of group 13/15 elements, the synthesis of compounds containing such multiple bonds is challenging and subject to oligomerization. The most common example of compounds with 13/15 group multiple bonds are those with B=N units. The boron-nitrogen-hydride compounds are candidates for hydrogen storage. In contrast, multiple bonding between aluminium and nitrogen Al=N, Gallium and nitrogen (Ga=N), boron and phosphorus (B=P), or boron and arsenic (B=As) are less common.

Synthesis 

Suitable precursors are crucial for the synthesis of group 13/15 multiple bond-containing species. In most successfully isolated structures, sterically demanding ligands are utilized to stabilize such bondings.

Boraphosphenes (P=B) 
Boraphosphenes, also known as phosphoboranes, was first reported by Cowley and co-workers in the 1980s. [(tmp)B=P(Ar)] (tmp= 2,2,6,6,-tetramethylpiperidina, Ar= 2,4,6-t-Bu3C6H2) was characterized by mass spectroscopy (EI MS) , and the corresponding dimer, diphosphadiboretane, was characterized by X-ray crystallography. The Power and co-workers later reported the structure of [P(R)=BMes2Li(Et2O)2] (R = phenyl, cyclohexane, and mesitylene), which is the first B=P double bond observed in solid state. The synthesis of [P(R)=BMes2Li(Et2O)2] starts from treating in-situ generated Mes2BPHR with 1 equivalent of t-BuLi in Et2O, followed by crystallization at low temperature.

Cyclic system with P-B multiple bonds 

Isomerization of four-member P-B cycles was investigated by Bourissou and Bertrand. It was reported that cycle-[R2PB(R')-B(R')-P(Ph)2] (R = phenyl, isopropyl; R'= tert-butyl, 2,3,5,6-tetramethyl phenyl) isomerize to form cycle-[R2P-B(R')=P(Ph)-B(R')(Ph)] upon irradiation. An example of five-membered ring was reported by Crossley suggesting that a reaction of 1,2-diphosphinobenzene with n-BuLi and Cl2BPh yielded a benzodiphosphaborolediide. Several six-membered ring systems involving P=B double bonds have been reported. One of the example is an analogue of borazine synthesizing from MesBBr2 and CyP(H)Li.

Arsinideneborates (As=B) 
A similar strategy to access litigated arsinideneborate was reported by Power and co-workers after the establishment of synthesizing litigated phosphinideneborates. Crystallizing [As(Ph)=BMes2Li(THF)3] with two equivalence of TMEDA yielded [As(Ph)=BMes2][Li(TMEDA)2]. Ring-systems containing As-B multiple bonds haven't been reported yet.

Group 13 imides (Al=N, Ga=N, In=N) 
Synthesis of group 13 imides usually starts with low valent group 13 species stabilized by bulky ligands. A [2+3] cycloaddition of monomeric [DipNacnc]Al or [DipNacnc]Ga (DipNacnc= HC{(CMe)(NDip)}2) compound with sterically bulky azide, TipTerN3 (TipTer = -C6H3-2,6-(C6H2-2,4,6-iPr3)2), gives the iminotrielenes [{DipNacnc}M=N-TipTer] (M=Al, Ga). Additionally, dimers of Ga(I) or In(I) were reported to form the iminotrielens [(DipTer)M=N-Mes'Ter] with Mes'TerN3 (M = Ga, In; Mes'Ter =C6H3-2,6(Xyl-4-tBu)2).

Al-N triple bonds 
Transient Al≡N triple bond species were also investigated by reacting monomeric alanediyl precursor with organic azides. The unstable Al≡N triple bond species [iPr2TIPTerAl≡NR] (R = Ad, SiMe3) was not capture but further rearrange to tetrazole and amino-azide alone, respectively.

Phosphaalumenes and Arsaalumenes (P=Al, As=Al) 
The development of Al=P and Al=As species faced the difficulty due to the tendency of oligomerization of the lewis acidic Al and lewis basic P/As. In 2021, Hering-Junghans, Braunchweig, and co-workers reported the synthesis of phosphaalumens and arsaalumens with Al(I) precursors, [Al(I)Cp*]4 (Cp* = pentamethylcyclopentadiene). Reacting [Al(I)Cp*]4 with DipTer-AsPMe3 or DipTer-AsPMe3 at 1:4 ratio yielded the corresponding phosphaalumens/arsaalumens, which are stable and isolable.

Gallium-pnictogen double bonds (Ga=Pn) 

Synthesis and characterization of Ga=Sb species was reported by Schulz and Cutsail III with the reaction of [DipNacnc]Ga (DipNacnc= HC{(CMe)(NDip)}2) with [Cp*SbCl2]. The resulting Sb radical species, [DipNacnc(Cl)Ga]2Sb, was then reduced by KC8 to give [DipNacncGa=Sb-Ga(Cl)DipNacnc]. Utilizing the similar reaction pathway, a Ga=As species, [DipNacncGa=AsCp*], was successfully synthesized and stabilized. Interestingly, no radical formation was observed comparing to the case of Ga=Sb species. With the rapid development of gallium pnictogen in the late 2010s, the first phosphagallene species was reported by Goicoechea and co-workers in 2020. The reaction of [(HC)2(NDip)2PPCO] with [DipNacncGa] gave the phosphagallene, [DipNacncGa=P-P(NDip)2(CH)2].

Reactivities

Reactivities of boraphosphenes 
B=P double bond species has been studied for bond activation. For example, C-F activation of tris(pentafluorophenyl)borane by NHC-stabilized phosphaboranes, [(tmp)(L)B=PMes*] (L = IMe4), was reported by Cowley and co-workers. The C-F bond activation takes place at the para position, leading to the formation of C-P bond. Reactions of phenyl acetylene with the dimer of [Mes*P=B(tmp)] give an analogue of cycle-butene, [Mes*P=C(Ph)-C(H)=B(tmp)], where C-C triple bond undergoes a [2+2]-cycloaddition to P=B double bond.

Phospha-bora Wittig reaction 

Transient boraphosphene [(tmp)B=PMes*)] (tmp = 2,2,6,6-tetramethylpiperidine, Mes* = 2,4,6-tri-tert-butylphenyl) reacts with aldehyde, ketone, and esters to form phosphaboraoxetanes, which converts to phosphaalkenes [Mes*P=CRR'] and [(tmp)NBO]x heterocycles. This method provides direct access of phosphaalkenes from carbonyl compounds.

Reactivities of group 13 imides 
Compounds with group 13-N multiple bonds are capable of small molecule activation. Reactions of PhCCH or PhNH2 with NHC-stabilized iminoalane result in the addition of proton to N and -CCPh or -NHPh fragment to Al. The reaction with CO leads to the insertion of CO between the Al=N bond.

Reactivities of Ga=Pn species 

Small molecule activation takes place across the P-P=Ga bonds in phosphanyl-phosphagallenes species, where the Ga=P species behave as frustrated Lewis pairs. For example, the reaction of CO2 with [DipNacncGa=P-P(NDip)2(CH2)2] results in the formation of a P=P-C-O-Ga five-membered ring species. In contrast, H2 addition to the P-P=Ga fragment in a 1,3-activation manner. E-H bond activation of protic and hydridic reagents was investigated as well. Reactions of [DipNacncGa=P-P(NDip)2(CH2)2] toward amines, phosphines, alkynes resulted in the formation of [DipNacnc(E)Ga-P-P(H)(NDip)2(CH2)2]. Reversible ammonia activation was observed under 1 bar pressure in the presence of a Lewis acid.

Bonding and structures

B=P Double bond 
Natural bond orbital analysis of a borophosphide anion, [(Mes*)P=BClCp*]-, suggested that the B-P double bonds are polarized to the P atom. The B=P 𝝈-bond is mostly non-polar while the 𝝅-bond is polarized to the phosphorus (71%). DFT calculation at B3LYP/6-31G level revealed that the HOMO of [(Mes*)P=BClCp*]- has great B-P 𝝅-bonding character. In most reported phosphinideneborates, the phosphorus chemical shifts are much more deshielded than the starting materials, phosphinoboranes. The down-field resonances of phosphorus in 31P NMR suggest the delocalization of lone pairs into the empty p-orbital of boron.

Ga-Pn Double bond 
Natural bond orbital analysis was reported for Ga=Sb and Ga=Bi containing species, where electron populates more on Sb and Bi (62% and 59%, respectively). The Lewis acidic Ga results in the delocalization of electrons in Sb and Bi.

References 

Chemical bond properties
Wikipedia Student Program